William Heatherington Anderson (January 26, 1921 – April 1984) was an American football end who played one season in the National Football League (NFL) for the Yanks. He played college football for West Virginia.

Anderson was born on January 26, 1921, in Wheeling, West Virginia. He attended Triadelphia High School there before playing college football for University of West Virginia. He was a letterman in 1943 before being drafted to serve in World War II.

As a Yank he appeared in between five and six games, playing on offense and defense at the end position.

In 1946, he was signed by the Wilmington Clippers in the minor American Football League (AFL). Though sought by the Yanks, he decided to stay with Wilmington. As a right end during the 1946 season, he appeared in nine out of ten games, and was a starter in eight. As a receiver, he caught ten passes for 247 yards, a 24.7 average.

Anderson returned to the Clippers for the 1947 season, and compiled 166 receiving yards on eleven receptions, an average of 15.1 yards per catch. He also scored his only career touchdown, as he appeared in seven out of eight games. He left the Clippers in 1948, and stopped playing football professionally.

Anderson later resided in Wheeling, West Virginia. He died in West Virginia in April 1984, at the age of 63.

References

1921 births
1984 deaths
Players of American football from West Virginia
American football ends
West Virginia Mountaineers football players
Boston Yanks players
Brooklyn Tigers players
Wilmington Clippers players
People from Ohio County, West Virginia